Uptown is a commercial district in southwestern Minneapolis in the U.S. state of Minnesota, that is centered at the intersection of Hennepin Avenue and West Lake Street. It has traditionally spanned the corners of four neighborhoods, Lowry Hill East, East Bde Maka Ska, South Uptown and East Isles neighborhoods, which are all within the Calhoun Isles community. Historically, the boundaries of Uptown are Bde Maka Ska (formerly Lake Calhoun) to the west, Dupont Avenue to the east, 31st Street to the south, and 28th Street to the north; though these borders often vary. Uptown is a popular destination for  retail, nightlife, and cultural events, and the district was famously written about by recording artist Prince.

History
The Lakes Area of Bde Maka Ska, Lake Harriet, and Lake of the Isles became popular in the 1880s as vacation cottages, hotels, and boating recreation became available by streetcar.  As Minneapolis expanded south, housing construction boomed through the 1920s.  A commercial district began forming just east of the Lakes Area.  At the intersection of Hennepin Avenue and Lagoon Avenue, the Lagoon Theatre was built, a multi-function vaudeville theater. When the Lagoon burnt down in 1939, owners sought to rebuild and the business community took the opportunity to rebrand the area. Following the success of Chicago's Uptown District, the Minneapolis Tribune announced the new Uptown District of Minneapolis centered on the newly renamed Uptown Theatre.

Through the 20th century, Uptown was primarily a family area centered around nearby West High School at Hennepin and West 28th Street. Modest housing along Lowry Hill met the mansions of Kenwood to the west and around the lakes. Hennepin flourished as a commercial corridor and route from downtown to residential homes, while Uptown served also as an important streetcar route from Uptown to the vacation homes of Lake Minnetonka. White flight via the freeway system after World War II and closing of West High School in 1982 (razed in 1984) signaled a demographic shift in the area. Blight and crime began moving into Lowry Hill though were kept at bay by the Kenwood area. Neighborhood associations and formal borders were designated in the 1970s as each section of Uptown began addressing domestic problems.

During this time, Uptown developed an artist culture.  The history of this culture is preserved in the annual Uptown Art Fair. In 1980, Minneapolis musician Prince released his seminal album Dirty Mind, which contained his paean to these artists, appropriately titled "Uptown". In the 1990s he opened "New Power Generation," a retail store at 1408 West Lake Street, and in 1998 released "Calhoun Square," a song written in 1993, on his Crystal Ball album.  A retail renaissance of the area occurred in the 1980s when Seven Points (formerly named Calhoun Square) was developed. Combining a half block of existing storefront buildings plus new construction, the renovation turned the area into a competitive retail draw from Downtown and from the suburban dales (malls).  As the popularity of Uptown as a residential district grew again, the definition of the area expanded.

The Lake Street Council launched a Museum In the Streets project, a series of free, self-guided walking tours highlighting business districts along Lake Street, including Uptown. The Uptown Tour spotlights historic businesses and places in the neighborhood, including the origins of Abdallah Candies, Schlampp & Sons Furriers, and the Uptown Theater.

The neighborhood experienced civil unrest in the aftermath of the killing of Winston Boogie Smith by law enforcement officers on June 3, 2021. Smith, a 32-year-old black American man, allegedly fired a gun as they attempted to apprehend him in a parking ramp belonging to Seven Points near West Lake Street and Girard Avenue. Protests were held over subsequent weeks with demonstrators periodically occupying a street intersection and nearby vacant lot near where Smith was killed, until eventually said lot was fenced off. On the night of June 13, a demonstrator, Deona Knajdek, was killed when a vehicle rammed into a street demonstration.

Culture
Uptown is a mix of various cultural strains and is considered an area for young people to live and shop. It was formerly known as a vibrant center for artists and musicians, a center for Counterculture, and hippies, similar to East Village, Manhattan. The artist community was popularized by the musician Prince, who started his career in Uptown. The area has experienced gentrification, and is no longer considered the bohemian area it once was. Many of the older buildings and long-standing businesses in the area have closed or been torn down due to gentrification. But the area is still considered vibrant and walkable.

This area has a vast variety of ethnic food and grocery stores from Asian to Mexican to middle eastern. Uptown's more than 20 bars within a three-block radius draw people from across the metro area to revel in the district.  Uptown seems to draw a "slightly older and 'more sophisticated'" clientele compared to the Warehouse District. Controversy about noise, particularly surrounding bar's rooftop patios.  In 2011 City Council Member Meg Tuthill wrote a noise ordinance to address the issue, but it was afterwards withdrawn.

The area annually hosts the Uptown Art Fair, during the first full weekend of August. Local, national, and world artists converge to exhibit and sell fine art. Art media include paintings, sculptures, clothing, pottery, jewelry, glass, and mixed media.

Demographics
As of 2000 the current population for Uptown Minneapolis was 30,564 of which 15,947 are male and 14,617 are female. The population consists of 19,314 Caucasians, 4,930 African-Americans, 4,729 Hispanics, 1,630 Asians, 514 Native Americans, and 32 native Hawaiian. Fewer than 3,600 of this population are children under 5 and citizens over the age of 65. The median age is 29 years old.  The majority age of this area is people 18 years and older.  The average household size is 2.05 while the average family size is 3.19.  Uptown Minneapolis has a total of 15,033
housing units of which 75% are renter occupied while 3% of housing units were vacant.  Social characteristics showed 40.08% of population completed a bachelor's degree or higher while 84.9% had completed a high school degree or higher. The median household income is $34,216.00, the median family income is $38,634.00.

Economy
Uptown is renowned for its lively arts and entertainment options that feature many restaurants, stores, night clubs, bars, and theaters. In the 2000s, however, the neighborhoods surrounding Uptown have seen a surge in gentrification. This has caused an increase in property value and in property taxes.

Transportation
The Uptown Transit Station is located on Hennepin Avenue over the 29th Street Greenway and serves Metro Transit buses 6, 12, 17, 21, 23, 53, 114 and 115.  The station also has a change machine, a heated interior, binoculars, bike lockers and posts, and a workers lounge and office area. The Midtown Greenway, a former railway cutting which now hosts a bike path, bisects Uptown roughly a block north of Lake Street (where 29th Street would otherwise have been located). To improve the ease of transportation in a community that is currently pedestrian heavy, Hennepin County is considering the addition of a streetcar in the Greenway.

Notable residents
Bob Stinson, musician 
Lyle Wright, businessman and hockey manager

References

External links
Uptown Association

Neighborhoods in Minneapolis
Economy of Minneapolis